Godogani is a village in Terjola Municipality, Imereti, in west-central Georgia. It is the location of the Sakajia Cave Natural Monument.

References

Populated places in Terjola Municipality
Kutaisi Governorate